Billix is a live USB or live CD that supports multiple Linux distributions (including several special purpose distributions).  Billix was designed as a toolkit for UNIX and Linux system administrators.

As configured, it supports several distributions:

Damn Small Linux
Ubuntu (three most current versions plus server versions of each)
Debian (two most current versions)
CentOS (two most current versions)
Fedora (latest version)

Also, the following programs are included:

Memtest86
DBAN

External links

 Billix homepage
 Billix project on SourceForge.net
 Billix: Sysadmin's Swiss Army Knife at LinuxJournal.com
 Announcing Billix 0.27 and... SuperBillix 0.27! at LinuxJournal.com

Live USB
Operating system distributions bootable from read-only media